Rufa is a given name. Notable people with the name include:

Rufa Mae Quinto (born 1978), Filipina actress, comedian, television host, and singer
Rufa Mi (born 1988), Filipina comedian, presenter, actress, and singer